Elijah ben Solomon Zalman, ( Rabbi Eliyahu ben Shlomo Zalman) known as the Vilna Gaon (Yiddish: דער װילנער גאון Der Vilner Gaon) or Elijah of Vilna, or by his Hebrew acronym HaGra ("HaGaon Rabbenu Eliyahu": "The sage, our teacher, Elijah"; Sialiec, April 23, 1720Vilnius October 9, 1797), was a Lithuanian Jewish Talmudist, halakhist, kabbalist, and the foremost leader of misnagdic (non-hasidic) Jewry of the past few centuries. He is commonly referred to in Hebrew as ha-Gaon he-Chasid mi-Vilna, "the pious genius from Vilnius".

Through his annotations and emendations of Talmudic and other texts, he became one of the most familiar and influential figures in rabbinic study since the Middle Ages. He is considered as one of the Acharonim, and by some as one of the Rishonim. Large groups of people, including many yeshivas, uphold the set of Jewish customs and rites (minhag), the "minhag ha-Gra", named after him, and which is also considered by many to be the prevailing Ashkenazi minhag in Jerusalem.

Born in Sielec in the Brest Litovsk Voivodeship (today Sialiec, Belarus), the Gaon displayed extraordinary talent while still a child. By the time he was twenty years old, rabbis were submitting their most difficult halakhic problems to him for legal rulings. He was a prolific author, writing such works as glosses on the Babylonian Talmud and Shulchan Aruch known as Bi'urei ha-Gra ("Elaborations by the Gra"), a running commentary on the Mishnah, Shenoth Eliyahu ("The Years of Elijah"), and insights on the Pentateuch entitled Adereth Eliyahu ("The Cloak of Elijah"), published by his son.  Various Kabbalistic works have commentaries in his name, and he wrote commentaries on the Proverbs and other books of the Tanakh later on in his life.  None of his manuscripts were published in his lifetime.

When Hasidic Judaism became influential in his native town, the Vilna Gaon joined the "opposers" or Misnagdim, rabbis and heads of the Polish communities, to curb Hasidic influence. 

He encouraged his students to study natural sciences, and translated geometry books to Yiddish and Hebrew.

Youth and education
The Vilna Gaon was born in Sialiec, Polish–Lithuanian Commonwealth on April 23, 1720 as Elijah Ben Solomon Zalman to a well known rabbinical family.

According to Legend he had committed the Tanakh to memory by the age of four, and aged seven he was taught Talmud by Moses Margalit, future rabbi of Kėdainiai and the author of a commentary to the Jerusalem Talmud, entitled Pnei Moshe ("The Face of Moses").  He possessed an eidetic memory. By eight, he was studying astronomy during his free time. From the age of ten he continued his studies without the aid of a teacher, and by the age of eleven he had committed the entire Talmud to memory.

Later he decided to go into "exile" and he wandered in various parts of Europe including Poland and Germany. By the time he was twenty years old, rabbis were submitting their most difficult halakhic problems to him. He returned to his native city in 1748, having by then acquired considerable renown.

Methods of study
The Gaon applied to the Talmud and rabbinic literature proper philological method making an attempt toward a critical examination of the text.

He devoted much time to the study of the Torah and Hebrew grammar, and was knowledgeable in scientific pursuits of the time. He exorted his pupils and friends to pursue plain and simple methods of study, and not to neglect secular sciences, maintaining that Judaism could only gain by their study. The Gaon was also attracted to the study of Kabbalah; his controversy with Hasidic Judaism stems not from a rejection of mysticism per se, but from a profoundly different understanding of its teachings, in particular regarding its relationship to halakha and the Ashkenazic minhag.

The Vilna Gaon was modest; declining to accept the office of rabbi, though it was often offered to him. In his later years he also refused to give approbations, though this was the privilege of great rabbis. He led a retiring life, only lecturing from time to time to a few chosen pupils.

In 1755, when the Gaon was thirty-five, Rabbi Jonathan Eybeschütz, then sixty-five years old, requested an examination of his amulets, which were a subject of disagreement between himself and Rabbi Jacob Emden. The Vilna Gaon, in a letter to Eybeschütz, stated his support of Eybeschutz, however he also stated that his opinion would not be of any weight with the contending parties.

Antagonism to Hasidism

When Hasidic Judaism became influential in Vilna, the Vilna Gaon joined rabbis and heads of the Polish communities, to speak against Hasidic influence.

In 1781, when the Hasidim renewed their proselytizing work under the leadership of their Rabbi Shneur Zalman of Liadi (the "Ba'al Ha'tanya"), the Gaon excommunicated them again, declaring them to be heretics with whom no pious Jew might intermarry.

Other work
Except for the conflict with the Hasidim, the Vilna Gaon rarely engaged in public affairs and, so far as is known, did not preside over any school in Vilna. He was satisfied with lecturing in his bet ha-midrash to a few chosen pupils, whom he initiated into his methods. He taught them Hebrew grammar, Hebrew Bible, and Mishna, subjects that were largely neglected by the Talmudists of that time. He was especially anxious to introduce them to the study of midrash literature, and the Minor Treatises of the Talmud, which were very little known by the scholars of his time.

He laid special stress on the study of the Jerusalem Talmud, which had been almost entirely neglected for centuries. The Gaon encouraged his chief pupil, Rabbi Chaim of Volozhin, to found a yeshiva (rabbinic academy) in which rabbinic literature should be taught. Rabbi Chaim Volozhin opened the Volozhin yeshiva in 1803, a few years after the Gaon's death, and revolutionized Torah study, with resulting impact on all of Orthodox Jewry.

Asceticism

The Vilna Gaon led an ascetic life, being called by some of his contemporaries "the Hasid". This term meaning "pious person", and has no relevance to the Hasidic movement.

The Gaon once started on a trip to the Land of Israel, but for unknown reasons did not get beyond Germany. (In the early nineteenth century, three groups of his students, known as Perushim, under the leadership of Rabbi Menachem Mendel of Shklov, made their way to what was then Ottoman Palestine, settling first in Safed and later also in Jerusalem). While at Königsberg he wrote to his family a famous letter that was published under the title Alim li-Terufah, Minsk, 1836.

Works
The Vilna Gaon was a copious annotator, producing many marginal glosses, notes, and brief commentaries, which were mostly dictated to his pupils. Many maintain that it was his disciples who recorded his comments, if not his editorial notes. However, nothing of his was published in his lifetime. The "Gra" was very precise in the wording of his commentaries, because he maintained that he was obligated by Torah Law that only the "Torah shebichtav" (the written law) is permitted to be written down - the rest of "Torah sheb'al peh" (oral law) cannot be, unless circumstances require. (This further supports the view that it was his disciples who wrote his comments.) So the Vilna Gaon abided by this view of law by reducing his extensive explanations that are largely inscrutable to any but advanced talmudists. Glosses on the Babylonian Talmud and Shulchan Aruch are known as Bi'urei ha-Gra ("Elaborations by the Gra"). His running commentary on the Mishnah is titled Shenoth Eliyahu ("The Years of Elijah"). Various Kabbalistic works have commentaries in his name. His insights on the Pentateuch are titled Adereth Eliyahu ("The Splendor of Elijah"). Commentaries on the Proverbs and other books of the Tanakh were written later on in his life.

He was well versed in the mathematical works of Euclid (4th century BC) and encouraged his pupil Rabbi Baruch Schick of Shklov to translate these works into Hebrew. The Gaon is said to have written a concise mathematical work called Ayil Meshulash, which was an introductory primer to basic mathematics. According to popular myth/legend, it is claimed that the Gaon contributed to contemporary mathematics of his day, and that Cramer's rule is named after him (since his family name was Kremer). However, the rule is in fact named after the Swiss mathematician Gabriel Cramer, and there is no evidence that the Gaon was at all familiar with anything beyond basic (pre-Newtonian/high school level) mathematics, and certainly no evidence that he made any contributions.

Influence

He was one of the most influential rabbinic authorities since the Middle Ages, and—although he is properly an Acharon—he is held by many authorities after him as belonging to the Rishonim (rabbinic authorities of the Middle Ages).

His main student Rabbi Chaim Volozhin, founded the first yeshiva in his home town of Volozhin, Belarus. The results of this move is claimed to have revolutionized Torah study, by departing from the centuries of 'informal' study. Youth and scholars would congregate in local synagogues and study freely, although it was customary to migrate to towns possessing great scholars as the local rabbi. The Volozhin Yeshivah created a formal structure of the study, by providing qualified faculty, meals, and accommodation. The results of this process are currently the norm in Orthodox Jewry.

Somewhat ironically, viewed from a traditional light, the leaders of the Haskalah movement used the study methods of the Vilna Gaon to gain adherents to their movement. Maskilim valued and adapted his emphasis on peshat over pilpul, his engagement with and mastery of Hebrew grammar and Bible, and his interest in textual criticism of rabbinic texts, further developing the philosophy of their movement.

As for the Vilna Gaon's own community, in accordance with the Vilna Gaon's wishes, three groups of his disciples and their families, numbering over 500, made aliyah to the Land of Israel between 1808 and 1812. This immigration was one of the first modern Jewish migrations to Palestine, although Hasidic immigration was already active in the 1780s (even by the rebbes themselves, such as the elderly Menachem Mendel of Vitebsk and Chaim Chaykl of Amdur). The disciples of the Vilna Gaon, known as Perushim due to how they isolated themselves from worldly concerns to study Torah, originally settled in Safed because the Muslim authorities in Jerusalem prevented Ashkenazi Jews from settling there. However, after numerous devastating calamities in the region, including plague and earthquake, most of the disciples moved to Jerusalem. Their arrival in Jerusalem, which for over 100 years had been mainly Sephardi, revived the presence of Ashkenazi Jewry in Jerusalem, and resulted in a dominance of the customs of the Vilna Gaon.

The impact of the Perushim is still apparent today in the religious practices of the Israeli Jewish community, even among non-Ashkenazim. For example, the institution of the priestly blessing by the Kohanim known as duchaning during the weekdays (rather than only during festivals, as practiced in the Diaspora), and the accepted time for the onset of Shabbat in Jerusalem and other cities can both be traced to the custom of the Vilna Gaon.  However, the teachings and traditions of the Vilna Gaon have been passed down most directly to the Litvaks in Israel.  The Perushim also set up several Kollels, founded the Jerusalem neighborhood of Mea Shearim, and were instrumental in rebuilding the Yehudah HeChassid Synagogue (also known as the Hurba Synagogue, or "The Ruins"), which had lain in ruins for 140 years.

There is a statue of the Vilna Gaon and a street named after him in Vilnius, the place of both his birth and his death. Lithuania's parliament declared 2020 as the year of the Vilna Gaon and Lithuanian Jewish History. In his honour, the Bank of Lithuania issued a  limited-edition silver commemorative 10-euro coin in October 2020; this is the first euro coin with Hebrew letters.

The Vilna Gaon's brother Avraham authored the revered work "Maalot Hatorah". His son Abraham was also a scholar of note.

Death
The Vilna Gaon died in 1797, aged 77, and was subsequently buried in the Šnipiškės cemetery in Vilnius, now in Žirmūnai elderate. The cemetery was closed by the Tsarist Russian authorities in 1831 and partly built over.

Gravesite
In the 1950s, Soviet authorities planned to build a stadium and concert hall on the site. They allowed the remains of the Vilna Gaon to be removed and re-interred at the new cemetery.

See also
Hasidim and Misnagdim
Lithuanian Jews
Misnagdim
 Perushim
Vilna Gaon Jewish State Museum

References

Sources
 Etkes, Immanuel, et al. The Gaon of Vilna: the man and his image (University of California Press, 2002) 
 "The Gaon of Vilna and the Haskalah movement", by Emanuel Etkes, reprinted in Dan, Joseph (ed.). Studies in Jewish thought (Praeger, NY, 1989) 
 "The mystical experiences of the Gaon of Vilna", in Jacobs, Louis (ed.). Jewish mystical testimonies (Schocken Books, NY, 1977) 
 Landau, Betzalel and Rosenblum, Yonason. The Vilna Gaon: the life and teachings of Rabbi Eliyahu, the Gaon of Vilna (Mesorah Pub., Ltd., 1994) 
 Shulman, Yaacov Dovid. The Vilna Gaon: The story of Rabbi Eliyahu Kramer ( C.I.S. Publishers, 1994) 
 Ackerman, C. D. (trans.) Even Sheleimah: the Vilna Gaon looks at life (Targum Press, 1994) 
 Schapiro, Moshe. Journey of the Soul: The Vilna Gaon on Yonah/Johan: an allegorical commentary adapted from the Vilna Gaon's Aderes Eliyahu (Mesorah Pub., Ltd., 1997). 
 Freedman, Chaim. Eliyahu's Branches: The Descendants of the Vilna Gaon (Of Blessed and Saintly Memory) and His Family (Avotaynu, 1997) 
 Rosenstein, Neil. The Gaon of Vilna and his Cousinhood (Center for Jewish Genealogy, 1997)

External links

 Jewish Encyclopedia (1906) entry for "ELIJAH BEN SOLOMON (also called Elijah Wilna, Elijah Gaon, and Der Wilner Gaon): (Redirected from ELIJAH GAON.)," by Solomon Schechter and M. Seligsohn
 Encyclopaedia Judaica (2007 - 2nd edition) entry for "Elijah Ben Solomon Zalman"," by Istael Klausner, Samuel Mirsky, David Derovan, and Menahem Kaddari
 A Precious Legacy Works of the Vilner Gaon Eliyahu b. Zalman
 Biography from the Vilna Gaon Jewish State Museum

1720 births
1797 deaths
People from Byaroza District
18th-century Polish–Lithuanian rabbis
Kabbalists
Bible commentators
Authors of books on Jewish law
Rabbis from Vilnius